Leopold Vietoris (4 June 1891 – 9 April 2002) was an Austrian mathematician, World War I veteran and supercentenarian. He was born in Radkersburg and died in Innsbruck.

He was known for his contributions to topology—notably the Mayer–Vietoris sequence—and other fields of mathematics, his interest in mathematical history and for being a keen alpinist.

Biography
Vietoris studied mathematics and geometry at the Vienna University of Technology.
He was drafted in 1914 in World War I and was wounded in September that same year. On 4 November 1918, one week before the Armistice of Villa Giusti, he became an Italian prisoner of war. After returning to Austria, he attended the University of Vienna, where he earned his PhD in 1920, with a thesis written under the supervision of Gustav von Escherich and Wilhelm Wirtinger.

In autumn 1928 he married his first wife Klara Riccabona, who later died while giving birth to their sixth daughter. In 1936 he married Klara's sister, Maria Riccabona.

Vietoris was survived by his six daughters, 17 grandchildren, and 30 great-grandchildren.

He lends his name to a few mathematical concepts:
Vietoris topology (see topological space)
Vietoris homology (see homology theory)
Mayer–Vietoris sequence
Vietoris–Begle mapping theorem
Vietoris–Rips complex

Vietoris remained scientifically active in his later years, even writing one paper on trigonometric sums at the age of 103.

Vietoris lived to be 110 years and 309 days old, and became the oldest verified Austrian man ever.

Decorations and awards
 Austrian Decoration for Science and Art (1973)
 Grand Gold Decoration for Services to the Republic of Austria (1981)
 Honorary member of the German Mathematical Society (1992)

Notes

References

External links

1891 births
2002 deaths
People from Bad Radkersburg
20th-century Austrian mathematicians
Topologists
Men supercentenarians
Austrian centenarians
Members of the Austrian Academy of Sciences
Recipients of the Austrian Decoration for Science and Art
Recipients of the Grand Decoration for Services to the Republic of Austria
Austro-Hungarian military personnel of World War I
Austrian prisoners of war
World War I prisoners of war held by Italy
Austro-Hungarian mathematicians